Kamai may refer to:

 Kamai, Belarus, a village in Belarus
 Kamai, Uttar Pradesh, a village in India

See also 
 Kamei, a Japanese surname
 Kamay (disambiguation)